The following is a timeline of the history of the city of Memphis, Tennessee, US.

Prior to 19th century

 1739 – Fort Assumption built by French.
 1740 – Fort Assumption abandoned.
 1797 – U.S. fort built.

19th century

 1819 – Town laid out.
 1826 – Town incorporated.
 1827
Memphis Advocate newspaper begins publication.
 Marcus B. Winchester becomes mayor.
 1836 – Memphis Enquir er newspaper begins publication.
 1841 – The Appeal newspaper begins publication.
 1843
 New Orleans-Memphis telegraph begins operating.
 Memphis Daily Eagle newspaper begins publication.
 1844 – Calvary Episcopal Church consecrated.
 1849 – Memphis incorporated as a city.
 1850
 Town designated a port of customs.
 Population: 8,841.
 1852 – Elmwood Cemetery established.
 1853 – Congregation B'nai Israel founded.
 1854 – Jones & Co. chemists in business.
 1855 – German Benevolent Society formed.
 1857 – Memphis & Charleston Railroad completed.
 1858 – Memphis Daily Avalanche newspaper begins publication.
 1860 – Population: 22,623.
 1861 – Memphis and Ohio Railroad completed.
 1862
 Tennessee capital relocated to Memphis from Nashville.
 June 6: Battle of Memphis takes place on Mississippi River near town; Union forces take Memphis.
 1864
 August 21: Second Battle of Memphis.
 First National Bank of Memphis established.
 1866
 May: Racial unrest.
 Greenwood School established.
 Memphis Post begins publication.

 1868 – Peabody Hotel in business.
 1870
 Goldsmith's store in business.
 Population: 40,226.
 1871
 LeMoyne Normal Institute and College of Christian Brothers established.
 St. Mary's Episcopal Cathedral consecrated.
 1873 – Yellow fever epidemic.
 1874 – Memphis Cotton Exchange founded.
 1875 – Southwestern at Memphis (college) established.
 1878 – Yellow fever epidemic.
 1879 – Yellow fever epidemic.

 1880
Sewer system construction begins
Population: 33,592.
 1882
 Tabernacle Missionary Baptist Church established.
 Chickasaw Cooperage Company incorporated.
 1883 – Young Men's Christian Association chartered.
 1885 – Peoples Grocery in business.
 1887 – Memphis National Bank organized.
 1890
 Nineteenth Century Club formed.
 Population: 64,589.
 1891 – City chartered again.
 1892 – Frisco Bridge (a cantilevered through truss bridge) constructed.
 1899 – Manassas High School established.
 1900 – Population: 102,320.

20th century

1900s–1940s

 1905 – Madison Hotel built.
 1906 – Memphis Zoo and Overton Park established.
 1909 – Bureau of Municipal Research active (approximate date).
 1910
 Commission form of government begins.
 Exchange Building constructed.
 E. H. Crump becomes mayor.
 Population: 131,105.

 1911 – Urban League branch established.
 1912 – Handy's The Memphis Blues (song) published.
 1914 – Union Avenue United Methodist Church built.
 1915 – Guthrie Elementary School founded.
 1916
 Harahan Bridge opens to West Memphis, Arkansas.
 Memphis Brooks Museum of Art established.
 Piggly Wiggly grocery in business.
 1917
 May 22: Lynching of Ell Persons.
 National Association for the Advancement of Colored People branch established.
 1919 – Citizens' Co-operative Stores incorporated.
 1920
 City hosts Commission on Interracial Cooperation Women's Interracial Conference.
 Population: 162,351.
 1921
Mississippi Boulevard Christian Church established.
1922
 WREC radio begins broadcasting.
 1923 – WMC radio begins broadcasting.
 1924 – Lincoln American Tower built.
 1925 – WHBQ and WMPS radio begin broadcasting.
 1929 – Memphis Municipal Airport dedicated.
 1930
 Memphis Museum of Natural History and Industrial Arts opens.
 Sterick Building constructed.
 Population: 253,143.
 1931
 Memphis World newspaper begins publication.
 Cotton Carnival begins.
 1932 – Memphis Times newspaper begins publication.
 1936 – Memphis Academy of Art founded.
 1937 – Firestone factory in operation in Hyde Park.
 1938 – Cathedral of the Immaculate Conception built.
 1939 – First Colored Baptist Church built.
 1940 – Population: 292,942.
 1941 – Mason Temple built.
 1945 – Lorraine Motel in business.
 1946
 Douglass High School opens.
 Tri-State Bank established.
 1947 – WDIA radio begins broadcasting.
 1948
 WMCT (television) begins broadcasting.
 13 year old Elvis Presley moves to Memphis.

1950s–1990s
 1950 – Population: 396,000.
 1953 – WHBQ-TV (television) begins broadcasting.
 1955 – WHER radio begins broadcasting.
 1956 – 
 WREG-TV (as WREC-TV) (television) begins broadcasting.
 Opera Memphis established.
 1957 – Satellite Records in business.
 1960
 1961 – Thirteen African American first graders join Memphis City Schools
Henry Loeb becomes mayor.
Population: 497,524.
 1965 – 100 North Main building and White Station Tower constructed.

 1968
 January: Henry Loeb becomes mayor again.
 February 11: Memphis sanitation strike begins.
 April 3: Martin Luther King, Jr. delivers I've Been to the Mountaintop speech.
 April 4: Assassination of Martin Luther King, Jr.
 April 8: March in honor of Martin Luther King, Jr.
 1969 – Sesquicentennial Celebration
 1970
 Vollintine-Evergreen Community Association organized.
Population: 623,530.
 1971 – Clark Tower built
 1972 – National Bank of Commerce building constructed.
 1973 – May: City hosts Rock Writers of the World Convention.
 Massive white flight occurs in Memphis City Schools.
 Desegregation busing begins in Memphis
 1974 – Women's Resource Center founded.
 1975 – Hyatt hotel opens.
 1976 – Temple Israel built.
 1977 – Memphis in May festival begins.
 1978 – Muslim Society of Memphis founded.
 1980 – Population: 646,356.
 1985
 Tall Trees (prison) privatised.
Morgan Keegan Tower built.
 1988 - Memphis tanker truck disaster.
 1990 – Population: 610,337.
 1991
National Civil Rights Museum and Pyramid Arena open.
Willie Herenton becomes mayor.
 1996 – City website online.

21st century

 2002 – June 8: Lennox Lewis vs. Mike Tyson boxing match.
 2003
 Clark Opera Memphis Center opens.
 July 22: Memphis Summer Storm of 2003, also known as "Hurricane Elvis".
 December 18: Airplane crash.
 2007 – Steve Cohen becomes U.S. representative for Tennessee's 9th congressional district.
 2008 – February 5–6: Tornado outbreak.
 2009
 October: A C Wharton elected mayor.
 City open government standard enacted.
 2012 – Population: 655,155.
 2015 – October 8: Jim Strickland elected mayor.
 2016 – Raleigh Springs Mall gets demolished

See also
 History of Memphis, Tennessee
 List of mayors of Memphis, Tennessee
 National Register of Historic Places listings in Shelby County, Tennessee
 Timelines of other cities in Tennessee: Chattanooga, Clarksville, Knoxville, Murfreesboro, Nashville
 Timeline of Tennessee

References

Bibliography

Published in 19th century

Published in 20th century
 
 
 
 
 
 
 
 
  (fulltext)

Published in 21st century
 Ernest Withers. Memphis Blues Again. Viking Studio, 2001.
 
 
 John Branston. Rowdy Memphis. Brentwood, Tennessee: Cold Tree Press, 2004.
 
 
 Sharon D. Wright. Race, Power, and Political Emergence in Memphis. Taylor and Francis, 2007.

External links

 
 
 
 Digital Public Library of America. Items related to Memphis, TN, various dates
 Tennessee State Library and Archives. Memphis City Directories, various dates (digitized)
 

 
Memphis